Casas Grandes is a town located in the northern Mexican state of Chihuahua. It serves as the municipal seat of government for the surrounding Casas Grandes Municipality of the same name.

As of 2010, the town of Casas Grandes had a population of 5,256.

References 

Populated places in Chihuahua (state)
Pueblos Mágicos